Nanzui Town is an urban town in Yuanjiang, Yiyang, Hunan Province, People's Republic of China.

Administrative division
The town is divided into 11 villages and one community, the following areas: Xinnan Community, Nanzui Village, Xingnan Village, Yubaixin Village, Liyang Village, Xibanshanzhou Village, Lishan Village, Hexie Village, Zhaogonghu Village, Mupinghunan Village, Mupinghubei Village, and Nanzuiyu Village (新南社区、南嘴村、兴南村、余百新村、鲤羊村、西畔山洲村、蠡山村、和谐村、赵公湖村、目平湖南村、目平湖北村、南嘴渔村).

References

External links

Divisions of Yuanjiang